Nemophora sylvatica is a moth of the Adelidae family or fairy longhorn moths. It was assessed by Hirowatari in 1995. It is found on the Kuriles and in the Russian Far East and Japan (including Hokkaido, Honshu and Shikoku).

The wingspan is 12–14 mm.

References

Adelidae
Moths described in 1995
Moths of Japan